The African Palm Weevil or Rhynchophorus phoenicis is a species of beetles belonging to the family Curculionidae.

Varieties 
 Rhynchophorus phoenicis var. niger Faust, 1899 
 Rhynchophorus phoenicis var. ruber Faust, 1899

Description
African Palm Beetles can reach a body length of about 25 mm. These large beetles are considered a serious pest in palm plantations, particularly damaging young palms, mainly Cocos nucifera, Metroxylon sagu, Raphia species, Elaeis guineensis and Phoenix dactylifera.

The life cycle of the African Palm Weevil is similar to that of other Rhynchophorus species. The adults lay eggs in wounds in the stems of dying or damaged parts of palms. After hatching, the weevil larvae excavate tunnels in the trunk and feed on the shoot and young leaves, frequently leading to the death the host plants. The larvae of this palm weevil are edible.

Distribution
The species is widespread throughout tropical and equatorial Africa, from Senegal to Ethiopia, Nigeria and South Africa.

References 

 Biolib
 Encyclopaedia of Life
 Plantwise
 James TANYI TAMBE1, Paola RIOLO, Justin Nambangi OKOLLE, Nunzio ISIDORO, Pietro Paolo FANCIULLI, Romano DALLAI    Sexual size differences and colour polymorphism of Rhynchophorus phoenicis in the Southwest region of Cameroon

Dryophthorinae
Beetles of Africa
Beetles described in 1801